Reginald Bernard Turner (born May 3, 1966) is an American former basketball player. Born in Birmingham, Alabama, he played college basketball for the UAB Blazers from 1985 to 1989. 

Turner was drafted by the Denver Nuggets as the 47th overall pick in the 1989 NBA draft. After spending rookie camp with Denver, he was traded to the Utah Jazz for future considerations. Turner was waived by Utah as one of their final preseason cuts on October 22, 1989.

Career statistics

College

|-
| style="text-align:left;"| 1985–86
| style="text-align:left;"| UAB
| 18 || 1 || 4.7 || .481 || – || .444 || 1.4 || .1 || .3 || .2 || 1.9
|-
| style="text-align:left;"| 1986–87
| style="text-align:left;"| UAB
| 31 || 8 || 16.3 || .538 || .500 || .712 || 3.5 || .5 || .4 || .4 || 4.2
|-
| style="text-align:left;"| 1987–88
| style="text-align:left;"| UAB
| 31 || 25 || 29.1 || .457 || .479 || .778 || 5.6 || 1.0 || 1.4 || .6 || 11.3
|-
| style="text-align:left;"| 1988–89
| style="text-align:left;"| UAB
| 34 || – || 33.4 || .507 || .333 || .868 || 7.4 || 1.2 || 1.1 || .7 || 19.5
|- class="sortbottom"
| style="text-align:center;" colspan="2"| Career
| 114 || 34 || 23.1 || .493 || .406 || .788 || 4.9 || .8 || .8 || .5 || 10.3

References

External links
College statistics

1966 births
Living people
American men's basketball players
Basketball players from Birmingham, Alabama
Denver Nuggets draft picks
Small forwards
UAB Blazers men's basketball players